Phelsuma madagascariensis is a species of day gecko that lives in Madagascar. It is among the most widespread day geckos and is found in a wide range of habitats. (The highly restricted Round Island day gecko is the only other extant species with a similar maximum length; the extinct Rodrigues giant day gecko was even larger.)

Subspecies
There are several subspecies:

 Phelsuma madagascariensis madagascariensis (Madagascar day gecko)
 Phelsuma madagascariensis kochi (Koch's giant day gecko)
 Phelsuma madagascariensis boehmei (Boehme's giant day gecko)

Phelsuma grandis, the Madagascar giant day gecko, was previously considered a subspecies of Phelsuma madagascariensis but has now been elevated to a full species.

References

Phelsuma
Reptiles of Madagascar
Reptiles described in 1831
Taxa named by John Edward Gray